The 1990 Maine gubernatorial election took place on November 6, 1990. Incumbent Republican Governor John McKernan defeated Democratic Party challenger (and former governor) Joseph E. Brennan in a tight contest. Independent Andrew Adam took in 9.3% of the vote. This was the last Maine gubernatorial election until 2022 in which the winner was of the same party as the incumbent president. This is also the last Maine gubernatorial election that a incumbent governor won with a smaller margin of victory in their re-election bid.

General election

Candidates
Joseph E. Brennan (Democratic), Former Governor of Maine and incumbent U.S. Representative from the 1st congressional district
John R. McKernan (Republican), incumbent Governor of Maine
Andrew Adam (Independent)

Results

Gubernatorial
1990
Maine